Groveton Independent School District is a public school district based in Groveton, Texas (US). The Football team of GISD won three state titles in 1984, 1989, and in 1990, the latter two led by future NFL star Rodney Thomas.

In 2009, the school district was rated "academically acceptable" by the Texas Education Agency.

References

External links

School districts in Trinity County, Texas
School districts in Houston County, Texas